Dongguang Station is a metro station in Chengdu, Sichuan, China. It was opened on December 18, 2020 with the opening of Chengdu Metro Line 6 and Line 8.

Gallery

References

Chengdu Metro stations
Railway stations in China opened in 2020